Jules Wuyts (born 8 February 1886, date of death unknown) was a Belgian swimmer. He competed in the men's 100 metre freestyle event at the 1912 Summer Olympics.

References

External links
 

1886 births
Year of death missing
Belgian male freestyle swimmers
Olympic swimmers of Belgium
Swimmers at the 1912 Summer Olympics
Sportspeople from Brussels